Gerlandino Messina (born on July 22, 1972) is a member of the Mafia in Sicily from Porto Empedocle. He was on the most wanted list of the Italian ministry of the Interior from 1999 to 2010 when he was captured in Favara.

He is the son of Giuseppe Messina, the Mafia boss of Porto Empedocle, who on July 8, 1986, was killed by the Grassonelli clan, which adhered to the Stidda – a criminal organisation rivaling Cosa Nostra. In revenge, six members of the Grassonelli clan were killed on September 21, 1986, in the so-called Porto Empedocle massacre.

He is considered to be one of the bosses of Cosa Nostra in the province of Agrigento, jointly with Giuseppe Falsone. 

On October 23, 2010, he was captured by a special unit of the Carabinieri while he was in his house in Favara, near Agrigento. He was wanted for Mafia association and several murders, such as the killing of police officer Giuliano Guazzelli in April 1992.

In 2012, he was sentenced to 9 years and 6 months of imprisonment for illegal possession of firearms.

References

External links
 Di Gati accusa Messina, Teleacras Agrigento, November 2, 2007

1972 births
Living people
People from Porto Empedocle
Sicilian mafiosi
Gangsters from the Province of Agrigento